The Torneo Internacional Nocturno Rioplatense was a friendly association football club competition contested by teams from Argentina and Uruguay.

The Internacional Nocturno was part of several tournaments contested by Argentine and Uruguayan clubs only (such as Tie Cup, Copa de Honor Cousenier, Copa Aldao, and Copa Escobar-Gerona, among others). It was held on four occasions during the summer recess of official competitions in Argentina and Uruguay between 1936 and 1944.

Torneo Internacional Nocturno was a predecessor of Argentine Torneos de Verano, first held in 1968 and always played during January and February in Argentina, with Uruguayan (and also clubs from other countries) being invited to them.

Format 
Participating teams played each other in a single round-robin system. The team with most points at the end of the tournament was crowned champion. That system changed in 1944 when participants were divided into two groups of five teams each, where the first of each zone qualified to play a final that decided a champion.

Participating teams 
Clubs that contested the International Nocturno during over the years were: Independiente, Racing, San Lorenzo, Newell's Old Boys, Peñarol, Nacional (all editions); Rosario Central (1936, 1938, 1944); Boca Juniors (1936, 1938, 1943); River Plate (1936, 1938, 1944); Estudiantes (LP) (1938, 1944); Huracán (1943, 1944)

Notable players 
Although being a friendly competition, participating clubs attended the Torneo Internacional Nocturno with their senior squads so some of most notable footballers of Argentina and Uruguay of those times played in the tournament.

Some of those players were  Francisco Varallo, Mario Boyé, Ernesto Lazzatti (Boca Juniors); Raimundo Orsi, Arsenio Erico, Vicente de la Mata, Antonio Sastre (Independiente), Bernabé Ferreyra, Carlos Peucelle, José Manuel Moreno, Angel Labruna  (River Plate), Roque Máspoli, Severino Varela (Peñarol), Atilio García, Roberto Porta (Nacional), Rinaldo Martino (San Loernzo), René Pontoni (Newell's), Waldino Aguirre (Rosario Central), Manuel Pelegrina, Ricardo Infante (Estudiantes LP), Emilio Baldonedo (Huracán), among others.

Notable matches 
The match where Nacional beat Estudiantes de La Plata 2–1 played on 19 February 1938 in La Plata remains as one of the most violent matches in the history of South American football and a clear example of the strong Rioplatense rivalry. Media that covered the match stated: "a victory from Nacional had to be avoided in any way, and we feared for the Uruguayan supporters' safety" (Uruguayan newspaper El Diario). On the other hand, Argentine magazine El Gráfico wrote: "Saturday at La Plata there were two fights, 50% to the ball, 50% to the rival players. Nobody was safe, even the referee was on the verge of being beaten".

It was revealed that there were armed persons at the stadium, and some of those people would have showed their guns near the lockers during the halftime. After being noticed of that, Nacional captain Ricardo Faccio encouraged his teammates to win the match "for us and for our families". Atilio García scored two goals (the second one with his shirt covered on his own blood after he had been injured) for the final win over Estudiantes. Because of that, the match (attended by 20,000) remained on records as "the match of the blooded shirts".

Beyond the violence, the Huracán 8–1 Peñarol (with a hat-trick by Norberto "Tucho" Méndez) on February 25, 1943, was the all-time largest win of the tournament.

Editions

1936

1938 

Top scorers

1943

1944 
Group A

Group B

Group A first place playoff

Final

List of campions

See also 
 Torneos de Verano (Argentina)

Notes

References 

i
i
i
i
i